Sulṭān Hāshim Aḥmad Muḥammad al-Ṭāʾī (1945 – 19 July 2020) was an Iraqi military commander, who served as Minister of Defense under Saddam Hussein's regime. Considered one of Iraq's most competent military commanders, he was appointed to the position in 1995. During his over 30 year military career, Sultan commanded two brigades, three divisions, and two corps of regular army corps before assuming responsibilities as Minister of Defense.

Career

Persian Gulf War
Sultan served in the Iraqi Army during the 1980–1988 Iran–Iraq War and later in the Persian Gulf War, signing the ceasefire that ended it. He survived several purges and became the highest-ranking general in the Iraqi Army. He was regarded largely as a figurehead in the Iraqi military without any amount of real control.

Iraq War
As the invasion of Iraq loomed, it was reported in The Guardian in February 2003 that Sultan had been placed under house arrest by Saddam Hussein, in a move that was apparently designed to prevent a coup. He criticized Qusay Hussein’s handling of the Iraqi Republican Guard, saying Qusay “knew nothing [about commanding military]. He understood only simple military things like a civilian. We prepared information and advice for him and he'd accept it or not.”  Nevertheless, he continued to appear on Iraqi state-run T.V., to preserve a sense of normality.

Sultan was number 27 on the United States' list of most wanted former Iraqi officials. On 19 September 2003, after nearly a week of negotiations, he gave himself up in Mosul to the 101st Airborne Division (Air Assault). Dawood Bagistani, who arranged the surrender to Maj. Gen. David Petraeus, said Sultan was handed over "with great respect" and was with his family at the time. Bagistani said the U.S. military had promised to remove Sultan's name from the list of 55 most-wanted, meaning he would not face indefinite confinement and possible prosecution. "We trust the promise," Bagistani said.

Special treatment for Sultan al-Tai could be an effort to defuse the guerrilla-style attacks that were taking a toll on American soldiers. Many of the attackers are thought to be former soldiers in Saddam's army. Seeing their former military leader well-treated by the Americans might have encouraged them to lay down their arms.

On 24 June 2007, he was sentenced to death by hanging for war crimes and crimes against humanity. However his execution was not carried out because of public disapproval from Iraq's president Jalal Talabani. In May 2018, Iraq's Parliament speaker Salim al-Jabouri, requested a pardon for Sultan al-Tai alleging medical reasons. He then was transferred from the prison in Nasiriyah to a prison in Baghdad.

Death
Sultan al-Tai died on 19 July 2020 from a heart attack in the Nasiriyah Central Prison.

References

External links
 Guardian website
 From Ally to Adversary
 Ex-Saddam defense minister set to be executed

1945 births
2020 deaths
People from Mosul
Tulfah family
Iraqi generals
Iraqi soldiers
Genocide perpetrators
Iraqi people convicted of crimes against humanity
Iraqi prisoners sentenced to death
Prisoners sentenced to death by Iraq
Government ministers of Iraq
Governors of Nineveh Governorate
Arab Socialist Ba'ath Party – Iraq Region politicians
Iraqi military personnel of the Iran–Iraq War
Iraqi mass murderers
Prisoners who died in Iraqi detention
Most-wanted Iraqi playing cards
Iraq War prisoners of war
Iraqi prisoners of war